Papikio is a mountain in Rhodope, Greece. Christian ascetics and monks lived on the mountain during the Byzantine period. Today, Byzantine monastery ruins can be found on the mountain.

In Bulgarian, Papikio is known as Orlitsa. In Turkish, it is known as Kartal Dağı. It is the highest point of the Eastern Rhodopes as well as the highest summit of the Komotini Ridge, which is shared by Bulgaria and Greece. The southernmost point of Bulgaria, Veykata (1463 m) is located a few kilometres to the north of Papikio.

References

Geography of the Byzantine Empire
Mountains of Greece
Mountains associated with Byzantine monasticism
Geography of Thrace
Rhodope Mountains
Byzantine monasteries in Greece